The Himachal Pradesh Legislative Assembly or the Himachal Pradesh Vidhan Sabha is the unicameral legislature of the Indian state of Himachal Pradesh. The present strength of the Vidhan Sabha is 68. The Assembly building is located in Annadale in the state's summer capital of Shimla.

List of constituencies since 2017
Following is the list of the constituencies of the Himachal Pradesh Vidhan Sabha since the delimitation of legislative assembly constituencies in 2008. At present, 17 constituencies are reserved for the Scheduled caste candidates and 3 constituencies are reserved for the Scheduled tribe candidates:

Defunct Assembly constituencies of Himachal Pradesh

See also
List of Lok Sabha and Vidhan Sabha constituencies of Himachal Pradesh by number of voters

References

External links 
 Map of constituencies of the Himachal Pradesh Legislative Assembly Published by Election commission

Himachal Pradesh
Himachal Pradesh-related lists